The 1982 Cleveland Browns season was the team's 33rd season with the National Football League.

The Browns were among eight teams that qualified for the playoffs during this strike shortened season, and became one of only six teams to ever qualify for the playoffs despite having a losing record. The Browns and the Detroit Lions from the same year are the only two teams with a losing record to qualify as wildcards.

The Browns' first round draft pick, rookie sensation linebacker Chip Banks earned 6.5 sacks in just nine games.

NFL draft 
The following were selected in the 1982 NFL Draft.

Schedule 

Note: Intra-division opponents are in bold text.

Season Highlights

Week 1 at Seattle 
Less than nine months after closing the 1981 season in Seattle, the Browns return to the Kingdome and defeat the Seahawks 21–7. Mike Pruitt accounts for 136 of Cleveland's 200 rushing yards and scores two touchdowns. The Browns sack Dave Krieg eight teams, three by rookie linebacker Chip Banks.

Week 3 vs. New England 
In their first game after the 1982 NFL strike that wiped out almost half the regular season, The Browns fight their way through a heavy Cleveland fog and beat New England, 10–7, on Matt Bahr's 24-yard field goal as time expires. Bahr's winner comes three plays after Browns safety Clinton Burrell recovers a fumble by Mark van Eeghen at the Patriots' 20.

Week 5 vs. San Diego 
James Brooks scores two touchdowns and Dan Fouts completes 18-of-23 passes as San Diego pounds the Browns 30–13, at Cleveland. Despite the loss, Brian Sipe completes 14 straight passes and stretches his overall streak to a club-record 33. He also surpasses the 20,000-yard career mark. Tight end Ozzie Newsome catches a career-high 10 passes and extends his streak of consecutive games with at least one reception to a club-record 45.

Week 7 vs. Pittsburgh 
Hanford Dixon intercepts three passes and the Browns keep their playoff hopes alive with a 10–9 win over Pittsburgh at rainy, muddy Cleveland Stadium. The poor conditions affect Steelers quarterback Terry Bradshaw more than Paul McDonald, who starts his first game in place of the slumping Sipe. Nose tackle Bob Golic enjoys a big game with eight tackles and one sack.

Week 8 at Houston 
The Browns escape with a 20–14 win, thanks to critical fumbles by running back Earl Campbell. The first comes at the Cleveland 4 and the second sets up the Browns' winning touchdown in the fourth quarter. Dave Logan scores one TD on a 56-yard pass from McDonald and Charles White scores the winner on a 1-yard run.

Postseason

Standings

Personnel

Staff / Coaches

Roster

References

External links 
 Season summary and statistics at Cleveland Browns.com 
 1982 Cleveland Browns at Pro Football Reference
 1982 Cleveland Browns Statistics at jt-sw.com
 1982 Cleveland Browns Schedule at jt-sw.com
 1982 Cleveland Browns at DatabaseFootball.com  

Cleveland
Cleveland Browns seasons
Cleveland